Pierre Laurent Robert (born 21 May 1975) is a French former professional footballer. He played as a left winger, and represented the France national team.
Robert began his professional career in his native France before making a move to English side Newcastle United, where he made his reputation as a free-kick specialist. His career has been noted for a number of high-profile disagreements with club management.

Early life
Robert was born in Saint-Benoît, Réunion.

Club career

Early career
Robert started his career at Montpellier, before signing for Paris Saint-Germain in 1999, and became a full international that summer. In a Champions League match against Rosenborg in 2000 he set up the sixth goal in a 7–2 win.

Newcastle United
In 2001, he joined English club Newcastle United for a fee of £9.5 million. During his stay at the club, Robert was known for his pace and crossing ability, and was often called upon to take corners and free kicks. He had a tendency to shoot from long ranges in both open play and free kicks (scoring four goals in the 2004–05 campaign, all from set pieces) and has scored from almost  from goal – one of his most powerful shots has been measured at around 75 mph. The club qualified for the UEFA Champions League in his first season by finishing fourth, their best finish in five years. However, at the start of the following season, there were reports he was unhappy at the signings made by Bobby Robson in the summer of 2002. Despite this, he still chipped in with the goals as the club made it to the second group stage of the Champions League before finishing third in the Premiership.

His partnership on the left wing with full back Olivier Bernard earned the two reputations as fans' favourites for their displays. Robert's trademark corners and free kicks, combined with his pace and athleticism, added to his reputation in England. He scored many long-distance wonder goals and free kicks, including  two against Tottenham Hotspur in December 2003 in a 4–0 win. It has been regarded as one of his finest displays.  Newcastle went on to finish a slightly disappointing 5th when compared to the 3rd they achieved in the 2002–03 season, but still managed to reach the semi-finals of the UEFA Cup despite the effect of injuries.

Robert spent several seasons at the club, before publicly falling out with manager Graeme Souness. His public criticism of the latter, as well as the entire Newcastle squad, resulted in Newcastle's desire to offload the troubled winger following the 2004–05 season. In his last match as a Newcastle player, Robert stripped down and threw his clothes into the Gallowgate End.

Portsmouth
Following his time at Newcastle United and a falling out with the club, Robert moved to fellow Premier League team Portsmouth in June 2005 on a year-long loan, with two additional years agreed following the completion of the loan. The deal was created in order to expedite Robert's exit from St James Park, while allowing Portsmouth to protect themselves from Robert's well-documented temperament.

In his time at Portsmouth, Robert scored only one goal, in a 2–1 away loss to West Bromwich Albion. He refused to sit on the bench for the club's 4–1 win over Sunderland, storming out of the ground despite the relegation-threatened club's position. His actions left the club with only four substitutes of a possible five for the match. Following the sacking of Alain Perrin and the reappointment of Harry Redknapp as manager, Robert was reinstalled to the lineup for the final games of 2005, but would shortly be followed by Robert's return to Newcastle after his unsuccessful stint. Newcastle would again look to offload the winger as soon as possible, and a move to Portugal would materialise.

Benfica
It was not long before he signed a three-and-a-half year contract with Ronald Koeman's Benfica side. Robert said: "This is a super club. To be able to play in the Champions League is fantastic and that's why I am here". He added: "They showed a lot of interest in me. I am very happy to be here."

A powerful but fairly central free kick was spilled into the net by Vítor Baía.

Levante
Robert signed for Spanish La Liga side Levante UD on 11 July 2006 on a free transfer from Benfica. He played thirteen games before the season ended, twelve of those were incomplete (with one red card), scoring no goals.

Derby County
Following a trial at Derby County, Robert signed a contract that would run until the end of the 2007–08 season.

Toronto FC
Major League Soccer side Toronto FC announced on 2 April 2008, that they had signed Robert to a contract. He made his debut on 5 April, against D.C. United in the 4–1 loss. Robert impressed, delivering a number of excellent set piece opportunities. Robert continued to impress in his team's second match against Los Angeles Galaxy, delivering a free kick, from which the subsequent rebound was converted by Jarrod Smith en route to a 3–2 victory, Toronto's first of the 2008 season. On 19 April, Robert scored his only MLS goal from a free kick in the 31st minute of the first home game for Toronto against Real Salt Lake, and was named "Man of the Match" in the 1–0 victory. In his last game with the team he was substituted at half-time.  He was waived by Toronto FC on 19 August 2008.

Larissa
Super League Greece side Larissa announced on 27 August that they signed in Robert for two-years, as a replacement for Nektarios Alexandrou who was released from his contract a few days before. He joined up with his former Newcastle teammate Nikos Dabizas.

International career
Robert appeared nine times for France, making his debut against Northern Ireland on 18 August 1999. He scored his only goal for his country on 15 November 2000 in a 4–0 win over Turkey. He was also selected for the 2001 FIFA Confederations Cup.

In film
Robert's goal against Liverpool in the 2004–05 season at St James' Park is used as the winner against the same team in Goal!. Character Santiago Muñez (Kuno Becker) strikes it and it zooms out as Robert's free kick hits the top corner. In Goal! 2: Living the Dream..., his overhead kick against Fulham is featured as Muñez's goal at the start.

Personal life
Robert's son Thomas is also a footballer. He signed for Scottish club Airdrieonians in July 2020 after leaving Montpellier.

Career statistics

Club

Honours
France
FIFA Confederations Cup: 2001

References

External links

1975 births
Living people
2001 FIFA Confederations Cup players
Derby County F.C. players
Expatriate footballers in England
Expatriate footballers in Greece
Expatriate footballers in Portugal
Expatriate footballers in Spain
Expatriate soccer players in Canada
French footballers
Association football wingers
France international footballers
French expatriate footballers
French expatriate sportspeople in Canada
French expatriate sportspeople in Greece
French expatriate sportspeople in Portugal
French expatriate sportspeople in England
French expatriate sportspeople in Spain
La Liga players
Levante UD footballers
Ligue 1 players
Major League Soccer players
Montpellier HSC players
Newcastle United F.C. players
Footballers from Réunion
Paris Saint-Germain F.C. players
Portsmouth F.C. players
Primeira Liga players
Premier League players
S.L. Benfica footballers
Toronto FC players
Athlitiki Enosi Larissa F.C. players
Super League Greece players
FIFA Confederations Cup-winning players